Piro is a poorly attested, extinct Tanoan language once spoken in the more than twenty Piro Pueblos near Socorro, New Mexico. It has generally been classified as one of the Tiwa languages, though Leap (1971) contested whether or not Piro is truly a Tanoan language at all.  The last known speaker, an elderly woman, was interviewed by Mooney in 1897, and by 1909 all Piro members had Mexican Spanish as their native language.

Corpus
The corpus of Piro is limited to place names, two vocabularies and an 1860 translation of the Lord's Prayer using Spanish orthography:

The Piro-origin place names listed by Bandelier are Abo, Arti-puy, Genobey, Pataotry, Pil-abó, Qual-a-cú, Quelotetrey, Tabirá (Gran  Quivira), Ten-abó, Tey-pam-á, Trenaquel and Zen-ecú (Senecú).

Vocabulary
As Piro was morphologically agglutinative, words were built from prefixes, stems and suffixes. For example, quen-lo-a-tu-ya-é ("mosquito") is glossed as "the insect that bites".

Piro was reportedly mutually intelligible with Isleta with many shared words and case stems. Of the 180 words in Bartlett's Piro vocabulary, 87% were identical or nearly so to their corresponding stems in Southern Tiwa. The vocabulary created by Harrington also contains several  loanwords from Spanish, such as pipa-hem for "pipe" (from Spanish pipa).

References

External Resources
 1894-7 Field Notes by James Mooney

Tanoan languages
Extinct languages of North America
Languages extinct in the 20th century